The 2014 AAA 400 was a NASCAR Sprint Cup Series race that was held on September 28, 2014, at Dover International Speedway in Dover, Delaware. Contested over 400 laps, it was the 29th race of the 36 race 2014 Sprint Cup Series championship, and the third race in the Chase for the Sprint Cup. Jeff Gordon won the race, his fourth win of the season and first at Dover since 2001. Brad Keselowski finished second while Jimmie Johnson, Joey Logano and Matt Kenseth rounded out the top five. The top rookies of the race were Kyle Larson (6th), Austin Dillon (24th), and Justin Allgaier (29th).

Previous week's race
Joey Logano took off on the first Green-White-Checker attempt to score his fourth victory of the season. “It feels good to go into the next one,” Logano said. “We’ve got to keep doing what we’re doing though. We’ve got to keep our eye on the prize and think about the big trophy at the end.”

Report

Background
The track's turns are banked at twenty-four degrees. The front stretch, the location of the finish line, is banked at nine degrees with the backstretch. The racetrack has seats for 113,000 spectators. Jimmie Johnson was the defending race winner from 2013.

Despite his name being on the entry list for this weekend's race, Ryan Truex was released from BK Racing on September 23. Sources within the team stated the change stemmed from unhappiness with the amount of feedback from the rookie driver. Travis Kvapil is expected to drive the car for the rest of the season.

Eight days after sending the case to a grand jury, Ontario County district attorney Michael Tantillo announced on September 24 that Tony Stewart would not be charged in the death of Kevin Ward Jr. The grand jury could not find sufficient reason to indict Stewart on any charges. “This has been the toughest and most emotional experience of my life, and it will stay with me forever," Stewart said in the statement. "I'm very grateful for all the support I’ve received and continue to receive. I respect everything the District Attorney and Sheriff’s Office did to thoroughly investigate this tragic accident. While the process was long and emotionally difficult, it allowed for all the facts of the accident to be identified and known. While much of the attention has been on me, it's important to remember a young man lost his life. Kevin Ward Jr.’s family and friends will always be in my thoughts and prayers.” NASCAR's Chief Communications Officer Brett Jewkes also released a statement. “There are no winners in tragedy,” it said. “Our thoughts and prayers remain with the Kevin Ward Jr. family and Tony Stewart as they all cope with this tragic incident.”

Entry list
The entry list for the AAA 400 was released on Monday, September 22, 2014, at 8:48 a.m. Eastern time. Forty-three drivers were entered for the race.

Practice

First practice
Landon Cassill blew an engine in the first practice session.

Qualifying

"It’s been an amazing year for everybody," Harvick said of his team. "They do a great job in preparing the racecars and put a lot of effort into qualifying, and it’s translated into a lot of good finishes." "This is the most important race of my career," Hamlin said. "This is the most important race now because it's in the present. If we’re going to live to race another day, we’ve got to get past this weekend. If not, we become somewhat irrelevant." Forty-three cars were entered so no one failed to qualify.

Qualifying results

Practice (post-qualifying)

Second practice

Final practice

Race

The race was scheduled to begin at 2:15 p.m. Eastern time but started at 2:19 p.m. when Kevin Harvick led the field to the green. Debris in turn four brought out the first caution of the race on lap 62. The race restarted on lap 68. Caution flew for the second time on lap 75 after Ricky Stenhouse Jr. made contact with the wall in turn 2. The race restarted on lap 80. Debris on the backstretch brought out the third caution of the race on lap 125. The race restarted on lap 130.

After leading the first 147 laps, Harvick surrendered the lead to Brad Keselowski on lap 148. He was dealing with a problem with the left-front suspension.

J. J. Yeley brought out the fourth caution on lap 171 after brushing the wall in turn 2. Keselowski traded the lead with Harvick on pit road thanks to pitting before the start/finish line. Harvick retained the lead off pit road.

The race restarted on lap 176. Kevin Harvick ducked onto pit road on lap 249 and handed the lead to Matt Kenseth. Kenseth made his stop the next lap and handed the lead to Clint Bowyer. Bowyer made his stop the next lap and handed the lead to Jamie McMurray.

Harvick cut his left front tire and brought out the fifth caution of the race on lap 254. Keselowski assumed the lead as a result.

The race restarted on lap 261. Jeff Gordon took the lead on lap 305. Gordon made his final pit stop on lap 328 and handed the lead to Matt Kenseth. Kenseth made his final stop on lap 329 and handed the lead to Carl Edwards. Edwards made his final stop on lap 330.

Jeff Gordon cycled back to the lead and kept it to score his 92nd career win. “I knew we could compete with the 2 car [Keselowski],” Gordon said. “The 2 was really good on short runs but we could run them down. He made us work for it there at the end... He got to me and I was really, really tight in traffic there at the end, so I didn't know if we were gonna pull it off.” Kevin Harvick, who led a race high 223 laps before cutting a left-front tire, finished 13th one lap down. "I don't know what happened to Kevin Harvick," Gordon said. "That was unfortunate for him. He was the class of the field. ... I was really tight in traffic there at the end. I didn't know if we were going to pull it off." "We can beat every car on the race track. We just need some good luck," Harvick adds. "We'll win races and have a shot at the championship." Kasey Kahne secured the twelfth and final spot in the points to advance to the Contender Round. “I had to push hard,” Kahne said. “I'm glad NASCAR just let us go and let us race for it. It was pretty interesting, but I'm glad we made it. We had to fight hard, and I think we had a Top-2 or 3 car today – just didn't get to show it.”  With this being the final race of the Challenger Round, A. J. Allmendinger, Kurt Busch, Greg Biffle and Aric Almirola were the bottom four drivers in points that were eliminated.

Race results

Race statistics
 10 lead changes among different drivers
 5 cautions for 23 laps
 Time of race: 3:03:51
 Jeff Gordon won his fourth race in 2014

Media

Television

Radio

Standings after the race

Drivers' Championship standings

Manufacturers' Championship standings

Note: Only the first sixteen positions are included for the driver standings.

References

AAA 400
AAA 400
AAA 400
NASCAR races at Dover Motor Speedway